Angels Among Us was recorded during The Tabernacle Choir at Temple Square's 2018 Christmas shows in the LDS Conference Center, featuring vocalist Kristin Chenoweth.  An album and concert DVD was released on October 12, 2019. The recorded concert was broadcast on PBS and KUED on December 16, 2019 and BYUtv beginning on December 19, 2019.

Track listing

Charts

References

2019 Christmas albums
Christmas albums by American artists
Tabernacle Choir albums